Baba Farid University of Health Sciences was established in July 1998 by Punjab Act No. 18. Punjabi and headquartered in Faridkot.

Faculties 
University has about 920 MBBS and 1,070 BDS seats across Punjab. Notable affiliated colleges include

Faculty of Medical Sciences 
 Christian Medical College, Ludhiana 
 Dayanand Medical College, Ludhiana 
 Government Medical College, Patiala 
 Government Medical College, Amritsar 
 Guru Gobind Singh Medical College, Faridkot 
Dr. B.R. Ambedkar State Institute of Medical Sciences, Mohali
 Punjab Institute of Medical Sciences, Jalandhar

Faculty of Dental Sciences 
 Baba Jaswant Singh Dental College, Ludhiana
 National Dental College, Patiala
 Sri Sukhmani Dental College and Hospital, Dera Bassi

Faculty of Nursing Sciences 
 Malwa College of Nursing, Kotkapura Faridkot
 Silver Oaks College of Nursing,Abhipur,Mohali.

References

External links 
 

Medical and health sciences universities in India
Universities in Punjab, India
Medical colleges in Punjab, India
Faridkot, Punjab
1998 establishments in Punjab, India
Educational institutions established in 1998